Doctor in Distress can refer to:

Doctor in Distress (film), 1963 film starring Dirk Bogarde.
Doctor in Distress (song), 1985 pop music single based on the television series Doctor Who